Harold Cooper may refer to:

Harold More Cooper (1886–1970), Australian anthropologist
Harold Cooper (baseball) (1923–2010), minor league baseball executive and county commissioner of Franklin County, Ohio
Harry Cooper (veterinarian) (born 1943), Australian veterinarian and television personality
Hal Cooper (director) (1923–2014), American television director and producer
Hal Cooper (ice hockey) (1913–1977), Canadian ice hockey player

See also
Harry Cooper (disambiguation)